Habronattus californicus is a species of jumping spider in the family Salticidae. It is found in California in the United States and along the Baja California Peninsula in Mexico.

References

Salticidae
Articles created by Qbugbot
Spiders described in 1904
Taxa named by Nathan Banks